White River Township is one of eleven townships in Randolph County, Indiana. As of the 2010 census, its population was 7,513 and it contained 3,405 housing units.

History
White River Township was established in 1818.

Geography

Cities and towns
 Winchester

Unincorporated towns
 Buena Vista at 
 Maxville at 
 Mull at 
(This list is based on USGS data and may include former settlements.)

Education
White River Township residents may obtain a free library card from the Winchester Community Public Library in Winchester.

References

External links
 Indiana Township Association
 United Township Association of Indiana

Townships in Randolph County, Indiana
Townships in Indiana